Robat (also Romanized as Robāţ) is a village in Hezarmasjed Rural District, in the Central District of Kalat County, Razavi Khorasan Province, Iran. At the 2006 census, its population was 362, in 92 families.

References 

Populated places in Kalat County